Zalug is a settlement in the municipality of Prijepolje, Serbia. According to the 2002 census, the settlement has a population of 1,047 people.

References

Populated places in Zlatibor District